Robert Lecou (born 25 July 1950 in Paris) is a French politician.

He was elected a Deputy of the National Assembly of France on 16 June 2002, for the 4th constituency in the Hérault department. He is a member of the Radical Party.

He stood for reelection in 2007 and won with 51.68% of the votes.

In 2008 he lost his bid for reelection as the Mayor of Lodève to the socialist Marie-Christine Bousquet who received 56.08% of the votes.

In the 2012 election
he was defeated by Frédéric Roig of the socialists.

Positions held 

 20/03/1989 - 18/06/1995 : Member of Lodève (Hérault) Municipal Council.
 01/03/1990 - 18/06/1995 : Deputy Mayor Lodève (Hérault).
 28/03/1994 - 18/03/2001 : Member of the Hérault 'Conseil Général'.
 19/06/1995 - 18/03/2008 : Mayor of Lodève (Hérault)
 19/03/2001 - 16/07/2002 : Member of the Hérault 'Conseil Général'.
 ../../1994 - : Vice-président of the Radical Party.

Awards 
 Chevalier of the Ordre national du Mérite.

References

1950 births
Living people
Politicians from Paris
Radical Party (France) politicians
Mayors of places in Occitania (administrative region)
Union for a Popular Movement politicians
Deputies of the 12th National Assembly of the French Fifth Republic
Deputies of the 13th National Assembly of the French Fifth Republic
Union of Democrats and Independents politicians